The women's 1500 metre freestyle event in swimming at the 2013 World Aquatics Championships took place on 29–30 July at the Palau Sant Jordi in Barcelona, Spain.

Records
Prior to this competition, the existing world and championship records were:

The following new records were set during this competition.

Results

Heats
The Heats were held at 11:12.

Final
The final was held at 18:36.

References

External links
Barcelona 2013 Swimming Coverage

Freestyle 1500 metre, women's
World Aquatics Championships
2013 in women's swimming